Greg Smithey is an American fitness and aerobics instructor. Best known for creating The Original Buns of Steel workout in 1987, Smithey has promoted health and fitness throughout his career. In The Original Buns of Steel, Smithey leads viewers through a series of exercises devoted to strengthening, tightening, toning, growing and shaping the buttocks, thighs and upper legs. Smithey incorporates the lower body strengthening exercises he used to train for vaulting into his workout. Over one million copies of Smithey's workout were sold on VHS tape. Smithey's projects include re-launching a DVD version of his Original Buns of Steel at the Original Buns of Steel official website. Greg Smithey has a BA in physical education, MA in education and is certified by IDEA as a fitness instructor.

References

External links
 Official website
  Buns of Steel (Video 1987) - IMDb

Living people
Exercise instructors
Year of birth missing (living people)